Chad K Nkang (born July 1, 1985) is a former American football safety. He was drafted by the Jacksonville Jaguars in the seventh round of the 2007 NFL Draft. Nkang played collegiately at Elon University.

Nkang has also been a member of the Winnipeg Blue Bombers, Hartford Colonials and Omaha Nighthawks.

Professional career

Jacksonville Jaguars
Nkang was drafted by the Jacksonville Jaguars with the 251st overall pick in the 2007 NFL Draft. He was released by the Jaguars on May 14, 2009.

Winnipeg Blue Bombers
Nkang signed with the Winnipeg Blue Bombers on April 8, 2010.

Omaha Nighthawks
Nkang signed with the Hartford Colonials in 2011, after the Colonials ceased operations, the Omaha Nighthawks picked him up in the second round of the Colonials' dispersal draft. He was released during training camp on September 6.

Reference

1985 births
Living people
American football safeties
Elon Phoenix football players
Jacksonville Jaguars players
Winnipeg Blue Bombers players
Hartford Colonials players
Omaha Nighthawks players